Ifeanyichukwu Stephanie Chiejine (17 May 1983 – 21 August 2019) was a Nigerian football striker. She last played for SSVSM-Kairat Almaty in the Kazakhstani Championship. She had also played for FC Indiana in USA's W-League, KMF Kuopio and PK-35 Vantaa in Finland and Zvezda Perm in Russia.

International career
She had been a senior international, taking part in the 1999, 2003 and 2007 World Cups and the 2000 and 2008 Summer Olympics. As of 2007 she had scored 15 goals in 61 games for Nigeria.

Death
She died on 21 August 2019 following a brief illness.

References

1983 births
2019 deaths
Sportspeople from Lagos
Nigerian women's footballers
Nigerian expatriate women's footballers
Expatriate women's footballers in Kazakhstan
Expatriate women's footballers in Finland
Expatriate women's footballers in Russia
Expatriate women's soccer players in the United States
Nigerian expatriate sportspeople in Kazakhstan
Nigerian expatriate sportspeople in Finland
Nigerian expatriate sportspeople in Russia
Nigerian expatriate sportspeople in the United States
Place of death missing
Nigeria women's international footballers
1999 FIFA Women's World Cup players
2003 FIFA Women's World Cup players
2007 FIFA Women's World Cup players
Footballers at the 2000 Summer Olympics
Footballers at the 2008 Summer Olympics
Olympic footballers of Nigeria
Women's association football forwards
F.C. Indiana players
USL W-League (1995–2015) players
Zvezda 2005 Perm players
PK-35 Vantaa (women) players
CSHVSM-Kairat players
21st-century Nigerian women